Australia Prepared is a 1916 Australian documentary film to show the country's preparation for World War I.

It was inspired by the British propaganda film Britain Prepared (1915) and was commissioned by Senator George Pearce. Filming took several months.

Unlike many Australian silent movies, a copy of it survives.

References

External links
Complete copy of film at Australian War Memorial
Australia Prepared at Australian Screen Online

World War I propaganda films
Australia in World War I
1916 films
Films from Australasian Films
Australian silent feature films
Australian black-and-white films
Australian documentary films
1916 documentary films
Silent war films